Gerda (minor planet designation: 122 Gerda) is a fairly large outer main-belt asteroid that was discovered by German-American astronomer C. H. F. Peters on July 31, 1872, and named after Gerðr, the wife of the god Freyr in Norse mythology. Based upon its spectrum, this is classified as an S-type asteroid. It is listed as a member of the Hecuba group of asteroids that orbit near the 2:1 mean-motion resonance with Jupiter.

Photometric observations of this asteroid in 2007 were used to produce a light curve that showed that Gerda rotates every 10.687 ± 0.001 hours and varied in brightness by 0.16 in magnitude. In 2009, observations at the Organ Mesa Observatory in Las Cruces, New Mexico generated a light curve with a period of 10.712 ± 0.01 hours with a brightness variation of 0.11 ± 0.01 magnitudes. This is compatible with previous studies.

See also
List of minor planets: 1–1000

References

External links 
 
 

000122
Discoveries by Christian Peters
Named minor planets
000122
000122
18720731